The C.D. Hulburt House is located in Monroe, Wisconsin.

History
Chauncey D. Hulburt was a prominent lumberman. His father, Julius Hulburt, was a member of the Wisconsin State Assembly. The house was listed on the National Register of Historic Places in 1979 and on the State Register of Historic Places in 1989.

References

Houses on the National Register of Historic Places in Wisconsin
National Register of Historic Places in Green County, Wisconsin
Houses in Green County, Wisconsin
Second Empire architecture in Wisconsin
Brick buildings and structures
Houses completed in 1878